Carl Bert Ulrich Friedemann (29 April 1862 – 9 April 1952) was a German-Swiss composer, conductor and musician. He wrote symphonic music, chamber music, choral works, songs and 140 marches, many of which are still played by marching bands around the world.

Life and career 
Friedemann was born in Mücheln at Merseburg, in the modern Saxony-Anhalt state of Germany. As a child he received lessons for piano and violin. He studied music in Halle (Saale) and with the court conductor Emil Büchner in Erfurt. By 1883 he conducted the orchestra of the Reunion-Theater in Erfurt; he left this appointment in 1885. Meanwhile, he had also learned to play the clarinet. He then joined the band of the 71st (3rd Thuringian) Infantry Regiment in Erfurt and continued his musical training, also appearing as a soloist in local concerts as a violinist and pianist. He also served as conductor of various choirs and choral societies. In 1888 he composed the now famous "Kaiser Friedrich Marsch" as a tribute to the dying German emperor. On November 5, 1890, he passed the military band examination at the Academy of Music in Berlin.

On 20 September 1891, he became conductor of the band of the 113th (5th Baden) Infantry Regiment based in Freiburg im Breisgau. He worked here for 21 years and his fame as a conductor and composer reached beyond national borders. In 1901 he was appointed Royal Kapellmeister in Baden and in 1906 he was appointed Royal Music Director. In January 1912 Friedemann conducted his regimental band at the Café Kropf in Freiburg for his farewell concert. For health reasons he left military music in 1912.

A new commitment was waiting for him in Bern, Switzerland. There he became head of the Bern Town Band, Stadtmusik bern, and raised this wind orchestra to a respectable level. Friedemann made Bern's civic music well-known; he was on the jury of the Federal Music Festival 1906 in Freiburg, which awarded Bern's band the 1st Gold Medal in the first rank of the first city in that category. With this band he made trips to Germany, France, Italy and Spain. When he retired in 1933, he was also made conductor laureate. In 1935 he was appointed Civic Music Professor because of his outstanding service. He also founded his own publishing company there and a music school. Friedemann died in Bern.

Compositions 

 Admiral Marsch
 Attaque de cavallerie: Charakterstück, Op. 145
 Bayrisch blau Marsch
 Concertino, Op. 182
 Ehestandsgeplauder, Op. 54 
 Fürst Egon Marsch, Op. 172
 Fürst Max Egon-Fanfare, Op. 152
 Fürstenberg-Fanfare
 Kaiser Friedrich Marsch, Op. 66
 Kaiser-Manöver-Marsch, Op. 81
 Paraphrase on Radecke's Song "Aus der Jugendzeit", Op. 146
 Rhapsody for Violin and Orchestra
 Slavonic Rhapsody No. 1, Op. 114
 Slavonic Rhapsody No. 2, Op. 269
 Slavonic Rhapsody No. 3, Op. 297
 Symphony No. 1
 Symphony No. 2
 Gruss an Bern (March)

References

External links
 
 

1862 births
1952 deaths
19th-century classical composers
19th-century conductors (music)
19th-century Swiss musicians
20th-century classical composers
20th-century conductors (music)
20th-century male musicians
Male conductors (music)
People from Saalekreis
Swiss classical composers
Swiss conductors (music)
Swiss male classical composers
20th-century Swiss composers